Chien Tai-lang (born 15 February 1947) is a Taiwanese politician. He was the Secretary-General of the Executive Yuan from 2015 to 2016.

Education
Chien obtained his bachelor's degree in sociology from National Chung Hsing University in 1970 and a diploma in public administration from National Chengchi University in 1990.

Political careers
In 1996-1999, Chen was appointed as secretary-general of Central Election Commission. In 1999, he went into the Ministry of the Interior when he was appointed as the administrative deputy minister in 1999-2009 and political deputy minister in 2009-2013. In 2013, he was appointed as the deputy secretary-general of Executive Yuan and in 2014 he became the Minister without Portfolio.

2014 Pingtung County Magistrate election 
In 2014, Chien was the Kuomintang candidate for Magistrate of Pingtung County, losing to Pan Men-an of the Democratic Progressive Party.

References 

1947 births
Living people
Taiwanese Ministers of the Interior